Vladimir Vyacheslavovich Isakov; born 28 February 1970 in Pushkino, Moscow Oblast) is a Russian sport shooter.

He has been a member of the Russian national shooting team since 1991. He lives in Pushkino and is married to Irina. They have a son, Maxim, and a daughter, Maria.

In the 2008 Olympic Games in Beijing, he finished fourth in the men's 50 metre pistol event, after winning a seemingly unimportant shoot-off for fourth place against Oleg Omelchuk (9.1 versus 6.5). However, after silver medalist Kim Jong-su was disqualified for propranolol use, this shoot-off gained in relevance, giving Isakov a new Olympic medal.

Olympic results

Records

External links
 profile
Bio on results.beijing2008.cn

1970 births
Russian male sport shooters
ISSF pistol shooters
Shooters at the 1996 Summer Olympics
Shooters at the 2004 Summer Olympics
Shooters at the 2008 Summer Olympics
Shooters at the 2012 Summer Olympics
Shooters at the 2016 Summer Olympics
Olympic shooters of Russia
Medalists at the 2004 Summer Olympics
Medalists at the 2008 Summer Olympics
Olympic bronze medalists for Russia
Olympic medalists in shooting
Shooters at the 2015 European Games
European Games competitors for Russia
People from Pushkino
Living people
Sportspeople from Moscow Oblast